Jacknife is an album by American saxophonist Jackie McLean. It actually comprises two volumes, one recorded in 1965 and the other in 1966. They were originally given the catalogue number of BLP 4223 and BLP 4236, but were shelved for ten years and issued together in 1975 as a double LP, with the number BN-LA457-H2. Whilst the 1965 tracks were released on a limited edition CD in 2002, those from 1966 have never been released singularly; however, they can be found on the four-disc Mosaic compilation The Complete Blue Note 1964-66 Jackie McLean Sessions, which was limited to 5,000 copies.

Reception
The Allmusic review by Michael G. Nastos awarded the album 3½ stars and stated: "The single CD (1-5) is quite worthwhile by itself, but tells only half of the story."

Track listing

 "On the Nile" (Tolliver) - 12:34
 "Climax" (DeJohnette) - 9:20
 "Soft Blue" (Morgan) - 7:30
 "Jacknife" (Tolliver) - 6:16
 "Blue Fable" (McLean) - 5:56
Tracks 1–5 recorded on September 24, 1965.
 "High Frequency" (Willis) - 11:30
 "Combined Effort" - 9:21
 "Moonscape" - 6:51
 "Jossa Bossa" (Moore) - 6:59
 "The Bull Frog" (Willis) - 4:28
Tracks 6-10 recorded on April 18, 1966.

Personnel
Tracks 1–5
Jackie McLean - alto saxophone
Charles Tolliver (#1, 3, 4), Lee Morgan (#2, 3, 5) - trumpet
Larry Willis - piano
Larry Ridley - bass
Jack DeJohnette - drums

Tracks 6–10
Jackie McLean - alto saxophone
Larry Willis - piano
Don Moore - bass
Jack DeJohnette - drums

References

Blue Note Records albums
Jackie McLean albums
1975 albums
Albums recorded at Van Gelder Studio